Paul Theunis (born 16 March 1952) is a retired Belgium footballer who played as a midfielder.

Honours 
KV Mechelen

 European Cup Winners Cup: 1987–88 (winners)

External links

References 

1952 births
Living people
Belgian footballers
Association football midfielders
K.S.K. Beveren players
K. Beringen F.C. players
K.F.C. Winterslag players
K.V. Mechelen players
Belgium international footballers
Belgian football managers
K.R.C. Genk managers
K.S.K. Beveren managers
K. Sint-Niklase S.K.E. players